was a town located in Awa District, Tokushima Prefecture, Japan.

As of 2003, the town had an estimated population of 11,556 and a density of 159.48 persons per km2. The total area was 72.46 km2.

On April 1, 2005, Ichiba, along with the towns of Awa (former) (also from Awa District), and the towns of Donari and Yoshino (both from Itano District), was merged to create the city of Awa.

External links
 Awa official website (in Japanese)

Dissolved municipalities of Tokushima Prefecture
Awa, Tokushima